Ouragan (French: "hurricane") was a  (torpilleur d'escadre) built for the French Navy during the 1920s. During World War II, the destroyer began the war in service with the French Navy and was undergoing repairs at Brest during the invasion of France. The British Royal Navy towed the destroyer to the United Kingdom and commandeered the vessel following the French surrender in 1940. They transferred Ouragan to the Polish Navy which kept the destroyer in service for less than a year. In 1941, the Polish Navy transferred the destroyer to the Free French Naval Forces, which in turn, transferred Ouragan back to the Royal Navy in 1943. Ouragan saw no further action and was broken up for scrap in 1949.

Design and description
They were powered by two geared steam turbines, each driving one propeller shaft, using steam provided by three du Temple boilers.

The main armament of the Bourrasque-class ships consisted of four Canon de  Modèle 1919 guns in shielded single mounts, one superfiring pair each fore and aft of the superstructure. Their anti-aircraft (AA) armament consisted of a single Canon de  Modèle 1924 gun. The ships carried two triple mounts of  torpedo tubes amidships. A pair of depth charge chutes were built into their stern that housed a total of sixteen  depth charges.

Construction and career
At the time of the German invasion of France in 1940, she was undergoing engine repairs at Brest. The Royal Navy towed her to Devonport where the repairs were completed. After the French surrender in June, the British commandeered her on 3 July and she was transferred to the Polish Navy on 17 July 1940. Until 30 April 1941 she sailed under the Polish ensign (using pennant number H16) but as OF Ouragan (OF - Okręt Francuski - "French ship"), instead of the usual ORP prefix.

Ouragan participated in operations around the British Isles, during which she suffered storm damage (flooded engine and boiler rooms) and a series of debilitating technical problems, requiring a total of 194 days under repair (compared to 31 days at sea). On 30 April 1941, after 287 days in Polish service, Ouragan was returned to the Free French Forces, who in turn passed her to the Royal Navy in 1943. She never returned to active operations, was decommissioned on 7 April 1949 and scrapped.

Notes

References

External links
 uboat.com
 Polish Navy in Scotland
 Polish navy

Bourrasque-class destroyers
World War II destroyers of France
World War II destroyers of Poland
Ships built in France
1924 ships
Destroyers of the Free French Naval Forces